Tim Hofman (Vlaardingen, born 9 July 1988) is a Dutch television presenter, journalist, poet, and columnist. Hofman often worked under the pseudonym of debroervanroos. He is, among other things, known as the presenter of the online program #BOOS, with which he won various awards.

Career 
After quitting three studies – Language & Cultural studies (Utrecht University), Dutch Language (Leiden University) and Communication Sciences (Amsterdam) – Hofman was admitted to the BNN-VARA Academy on 1 January 2011. After graduating from BNN Academy, he started at 101 TV as a reporter for TimTV and 101 Timeline.

After working for 101 TV, Hofman worked at the BNN and VARA program 24/7 as a reporter, panel member and internet expert from October 2011 to May 2012. Then in the summer of 2012 he made the program FC Gay for BNN. In the week before Christmas, Hofman was a reporter at the Glass House, where he regularly covered short news during the Serious Request Update.

In 2013 Hofman was a reporter for the BNN program Spuiten en Slikken, for which he made, among other things, Tims Tuintje, a ten-part series on the policy of weed in the Netherlands, in which he had his own cannabis farm. Hofman further more started his writing career with an article in the magazine Foxy, in which he had a Belgian lady undress in a laundry room. On 5 February, Hofman appeared in the BNN-KRO program Zeg dag tegen pesten. Hofman is also a regular guest as an internet expert at NPO Radio 1's BNN Today and De Wereld Draait Door.

In 2014 Hofman became presenter of the daily program De Social Club, Je zal het maar hebben, the studio of Spuiten en Slikken, Spuiten en Slikken op reis and Mijn 5000 vrienden. He also won the sixteenth season of the game show Wie is de Mol?

Together with presenter Jan Versteegh he was on the cover of L'HOMO. The presenters tried to bring homosexuality up for discussion. For this, they were nominated for the OUTtv Media Award 2016, an award that is awarded every year to a person who managed to positively promote homosexuality. For Spuiten en Slikken, Hofman traveled to the Philippines to document the drug war in the country. In June Hofman pleaded in front of the Lower House for a more open debate about drug use and a less strict policy, he was able to do this because of a citizens' initiative.

De Stembus (the voting bus), is an initiative that originated on Twitter, that urged young people to vote for the House of Representatives in 2017. Hofman, BNN chairman Zakaria Taouss and some other journalists were contributing to the initiative. One of the ideas put forward was to drive a van across the Netherlands and visit schools to draw attention to voting there. There was also a one-off route chosen by train throughout the Netherlands. Party leaders Mark Rutte, Alexander Pechtold, Marianne Thieme and Gert-Jan Segers went along with Hofman and the voting bus towards the young people on the trains. In addition to the bus and train, they wanted young people to be free on election day to vote and celebrate their democracy and the right to vote. The mission of Hofman and De Stembus was to get 850,000 young people who were allowed to vote for the first time that year to vote.

#BOOS 
Since June 2016, Hofman has been presenter of the online program called #BOOS, which can be seen on the YouTube channel with the same name, NPO and BNNVARA's online channels. In the program Hofman helps people solve their problems. As the episodes followed, special spin-offs were added to the program, including #BOOS POLERTIEK, in which Hofman wanted to support the young people in choosing their own political preferences. There were also spin-offs in 2017 and 2018 in which Hofman came to the aid of other target groups; in #BOOS BELGIOOS he only helped Belgian participants and in #BOOS BEJAARDENSOOS he only helped older participants.

In 2017, Hofman was beaten and broke his jaw during the shooting of #BOOS in a confrontation with the real estate trader Ton Hendriks. In an attempt to mediate in a protracted conflict between a real estate trader and some of his tenants, Hofman entered Hendriks' offices and fired two party poppers. When Hofman refused to leave, a scuffle ensued between Hendriks and some of his associates on the one side and the team of #BOOS and Hofman on the other, which then escalated, resulting in Hendriks hitting Hofman and breaking his jaw.

On 11 December 2018 Hofman offered the House of Representatives a citizens' initiative for a new children's pardon, this initiative gained more than 250,000 signatures collected with documentary Hofman made with the program #BOOS.

TV-programs 
Presenter:

 101 TV – TimTV (2011/ 2012)
 101 TV – Last Man Watching (2011)
 101 TV – 101 Timeline (2012)
 BNN en VARA – 24/7 (2011/2012)
 BNN – FC Gay (2012)
 BNN – Spuiten en Slikken (since 2012)
 Nederland 3 en 3FM – Serious Request (2012 and 2013)
 BNN en KRO – Zeg dag tegen pesten (2013)
 BNN – Spuiten en Slikken op reis (since 2013)
 BNN – Mijn 5000 vrienden (pilot, winner TV Lab Award 2013)
 BNN – BNN Presents: Zwarte Cross 2013 / Mysteryland 2013
 BNN – De Social Club (2014)
 BNN – Mijn 5000 vrienden (2014)
 BNN – Je zal het maar hebben (2014–2018)
 BNN – Stayin' Alive (since 2016)
 BNN –  #BOOS (2016–present)
 BNNVARA – TRIPPERS (since 2017)
 BNNVARA – Schuldig of niet (2018)
 BNNVARA – Over mijn lijk (2020–present)
 BNNVARA – Op1 (2020–present) as a substitute

Internetspecialist:

 De Wereld Draait Door – voor VARA

Documentaries:

 Paul – BNN
 Terug naar je eige land – #BOOS

Participant or guest:

 BNN – Ranking the Stars (2013)
 AVROTROS – Niets is wat het lijkt: Wie is de Mol? special (2015)
 AVROTROS – Wie is de Mol? (2016) Winnaar
 VARA – De Wereld Draait Door – Tafelheer
 YouTube – StukTV's Jachtseizoen (2016)

Bibliography 

 2017 – Gedichten van de broer van Roos
 2019 – Grappig Jammer

Columns 

 Columns for 3VOOR12 Den Haag (2011/ 2012)
 Columns for DeJaap.nl en ThePostOnline (2011/2012)
 Columns for DWDD Magazine (2013)
 "Gedichten" in Uitgeverij Lebowski's Achievers (2013)
 Columns for the Nieuwe Revu – In samenwerking met Maxim Hartman (2013-heden)

Radio 

 Columnist for Lust – BNN (Radio 1) (2011)
 Internetspecialist at BNN Today – BNN (Radio 1) (2012/2013)
 Poet for Jouw Ochtendshow – BNN (NPO 3FM) (2016)

Music 

 JIP – De Concurrent (ep) 2007
 JIP – Vernietigend Nederlands (ep) 2008
 F ft. Debroervanroos – Foto's van jou en mij
 Prinsenkind ft. The Greyness & Debroervanroos – Ah
 Prinsenkind ft. The Greyness & Debroervanroos – GNO (Guys Night Out)
 Piece van mij – Dave Budha ft. Debroervanroos

Awards

References

External links 

 #BOOS on YouTube
 Tim Hofman on Twitter
 

1988 births
Living people
Dutch television presenters
Dutch columnists
Dutch bloggers
Dutch journalists